Andrea Wolfer (born 16 December 1987) is a track and road cyclist from Switzerland. She represented her nation at the 2009 UCI Road World Championships and 2009 UCI Track Cycling World Championships. She competed in the points race and scratch event at the 2010 UCI Track Cycling World Championships.

Major results
2008
Grand Prix International Ville de Barcelone 
1st Scratch Race
3rd Keirin
3rd 500m Time Trial

References

External links
 
 
 
 
 

1987 births
Living people
Swiss female cyclists
Swiss track cyclists
Road racing cyclists
Cyclists at the UCI Road World Championships
Place of birth missing (living people)
21st-century Swiss women